Gandalfus yunohana is a species of blind crab found on hydrothermal vents on the eastern edge of the Philippine Sea Plate south of Japan. Because no light penetrates to such depths, the eyes of G. yunohana are immobile and unpigmented.

It was originally described as Austinograea yunohana in 2000, but was transferred in 2007 by Colin McLay to his new genus, Gandalfus, named after the character Gandalf from The Lord of the Rings.

References

External links

Crabs
Animals living on hydrothermal vents
Crustaceans described in 2000
Organisms named after Tolkien and his works